"Forgetting All About You" is a song recorded by the American singer and songwriter Phoebe Ryan, featuring guest vocals by the American recording artist blackbear. It was released on August 4, 2017, as the lead single from her second extended play, James (2017). Both artists wrote the track along with Joseph Kirkland, Jason Dean and Leroy Clampitt, the latter of whom produced it. The artwork for the single was created by Ryan herself. Ryan performed the song at the Billboard Hot 100 Festival.

Composition 
"Forgetting All About You" continues Ryan's transition from indie pop to a more mainstream pop musical style. It has a length of three minutes and nineteen seconds. The single lyrically talks about getting over a breakup.

Music video 
The music video for "Forgetting All About You" was released on August 18, 2017. It shows a series of hand drawings and animations by Ryan, with the lyrics shown in handwritten text.

Track listing 
Taken from ITunes.

Personnel 
Taken from Tidal.
 Phoebe Ryan – lyrics, composition
 Blackbear – lyrics, composition
 Joseph Kirkland – lyrics, composition
 Big Taste – lyrics, composition, production
 Jason Dean – lyrics, composition

Release history

References 

2017 singles
2017 songs
Columbia Records singles
Blackbear (musician) songs
Songs written by Blackbear (musician)
Songs written by Leroy Clampitt
Songs written by Phoebe Ryan